EnCor Biotechnology is a United States company that manufactures  monoclonal and polyclonal antibodies with a focus on reagents targeting neural proteins. EnCor was founded in 1999 as a spin-off from the University of Florida by Gerry Shaw, a British scientist initially a professor in the Department of Neuroscience, University of Florida, and now professor emeritus. The company is based in Gainesville, Florida and markets high quality and very well characterized antibody reagents at reasonable prices.

History
During his early career at the University of Florida in the 1990s certain of his antibodies made originally for research purposes were licensed to outside companies for sale. Some of these are still today sold by vendors such as Cell Signaling Technology, which however charges what Dr. Shaw regards as unreasonably high prices for them. EnCor Biotechnology was therefore formed at the end of 1999 initially to market antibody reagents made in Dr. Shaw's research laboratory at more reasonable prices. In late 2001 EnCor rented lab space at the Sid Martin Biotechnology Incubator, a facility dedicated to commercialization of intellectual property generated in the University of Florida. Following this move the EnCor laboratory produced an increasing number of novel antibodies which were made, characterized, documented, manufactured and subjected to rigorous quality control. The company quickly therefore increased the number of reagents available for sale and soon become profitable and, in 2006, relocated to new premises in Gainesville. The Gainesville facility has now expanded to three times the original size.

EnCor has always collaborated with basic scientists and clinicians to produce articles in peer reviewed scientific publications focused on the examination of various plasma, serum and CSF biomarkers of nervous system damage and degeneration. One of these is the phosphorylated, axonal form of the major neurofilament protein heavy chain protein which has the HGNC name NEFH, though is usually referred to as pNF-H in the scientific literature. Two further studies describe novel EnCor assays for UCHL1 and alpha-synuclein, two major brain proteins implicated in the development of Parkinson's and other neurological diseases. In 2022 EnCor, in collaboration with researchers at the University of Florida described a novel class of antibodies to neurofilament light chain with the HGNC name  NEFL, although the protein is usually referred to as NF-L. Surprisingly, one class of these antibodies bind epitopes hidden in healthy neurons and their processes but which are revealed on degeneration. Another class of antibody to neurofilament NF-L was shown to bind only neurofilaments in healthy neurons and their processes but failed to recognize degenerating and degenerated neurons and processes. These antibodies have been dubbed "DegenoTag" reagents and should have wide utility for researchers on neurodegeneration. A peer-reviewed report on this work was accepted for publication in the journal Brain Communications, and will appear both on line and in print shortly. By 2022, the EnCor product line had increased to over 250 items, the antibodies mostly being used for research purposes, with a particular focus on immunocytochemistry and western blotting, though many are also utilized for immunocytochemistry, immunoprecipitation and ELISA. Some have become useful for diagnostic histopathology and for monitoring the levels of protein biomarkers, of research and potential clinical utility. EnCor supplies reagents to research labs and other reagent companies such as Abcam, BioLegend, Thermo Fisher Scientific, EMD Millipore, Bio-Techne and many others. EnCor is well known for the quality of its cell, tissue and western blotting images, many of which have been made available on Wikipedia Commons and widely used in books, articles, posters, for teaching, advertising and many other purposes, see .

Key EnCor Publications

References 

 Article about University of Florida start up companies from Business Week, 2007
 Gainesville Sun article about one of EnCor's discoveries, 2005

External links
 

Biotechnology companies of the United States
Companies based in Gainesville, Florida
Biotechnology companies established in 1999
Research support companies
1999 establishments in Florida